Coke 2 could refer to:

New Coke, the reformulation of Coca-Cola introduced in 1985 and renamed "Coca-Cola II" in 1992
Coca-Cola C2, a low-calorie version of Coca-Cola introduced in 2004 using high fructose corn syrup and artificial sweeteners